WESB (1490 AM) is a radio station licensed to Bradford, Pennsylvania, United States.  The station is locally owned under the name "WESB Incorporated." Its sister station is WBRR.

The station is a full-service music station with its own news department. National news is provided by ABC Flex Network. Sports coverage includes Bradford High School, Pittsburgh Pirates, NFL Sunday Night Football, NFL Monday Night Football, NFL Thursday Night Football and NCAA college basketball.

WESB prides itself as being the News Leader of The Twin Tiers (Southwestern, New York and Northwestern, Pennsylvania). Hourly local newscasts run hourly from 5 am until 11 pm weekdays, 7 am until midnight Saturday, and 8 am until midnight Sunday. In addition, two extended newscasts are presented at noon each day and the 'ARG News Review' weekdays at 5pm and weekends at 9 am. Short news digests also play during Pittsburgh Pirates games.

Local hosts and shows include Community Spotlight with news director Andy Paulsen; the All Request Cafe 80’s Lunch with Igor; and Sports Reports with Jimmy Keltz. The syndicated Bob and Sheri Show airs weekday mornings.

On September 17, 2018, WESB signed on an FM translator at 107.5 MHz, also shifting its format to hot adult contemporary and rebranded to B107.5.

The station also carries the very popular listener call-in Gardening Show with Master Gardener Bob Harris, and co-hosted by Anne Holliday, from May through October.

Awards:
Anne Holliday wins PAB Award - 2015 - Outstanding Public Affairs Program - LiveLine
Anne Holliday wins PAB Award - 2016 - Outstanding Local Radio Newscast - ARG News Review
Anne Holliday wins PAB Award - 2018 - Outstanding Local Radio Newscast - ARG News Review
Igor wins 2 PAB 2012 Awards- Outstanding Local Radio Personality, Radio Promotional Announcement
Scott Douglas/Frank Williams win PAB's 2011 Outstanding Local Radio Personality/Team for The Morning Buzz
Igor wins PAB's 2009 Outstanding Promotional Announcement
Frank Williams wins PAB's 2009 Outstanding Local Sports Announcer
Igor wins PAB's 2010 Outstanding Promotional Announcement
Frank Williams wins PAB's 2010 Outstanding Local Sports Announcer 
Igor win PAB's 2011 Outstanding Radio Commercial

References

External links

ESB
Radio stations established in 1947
1947 establishments in Pennsylvania
Hot adult contemporary radio stations in the United States